Al-Barwayh is a sub-district located in Bani Matar District, Sana'a Governorate, Yemen. Al-Barwayh had a population of 5632 according to the 2004 census.

References 

Sub-districts in Bani Matar District